Flirty Dancing is an American dance reality television series created for the Fox Broadcasting Company. Based on the Channel 4 version in the United Kingdom, it is produced by Second Star, which produces the original, and All3Media, and debuted on December 29, 2019.

On May 18, 2020, the series was cancelled after one season.

Premise
Jenna Dewan hosts the show which features single people going on blind dates and dancing to choreographed routines.

Episodes

References

External links
Official Website

2010s American reality television series
2019 American television series debuts
2020 American television series endings
2020s American reality television series
English-language television shows
Fox Broadcasting Company original programming
American television series based on British television series
Television series by All3Media
Dance competition television shows